is a Japanese samurai kin group.

History
The Yūki claim descent from Fujiwara no Hidesato.

The clan is composed of two branches: the Shimōsa Yūki and the Shirakawa Yūki.  The split happened during the Nanboku-chō period. One branch supported the Southern Imperial Court, and the other branch the Northern Pretenders.

Like many samurai clans, the Yūki developed a code of provincial laws (bunkoku-hō).  In 1556,  Yūki Masakatsu published .

The Shirakawa branch was destroyed by Toyotomi Hideyoshi; but the Shimōsa branch survived as daimyōs of Yūki Domain in Shimōsa Province.

The Shimōsa Yūki became part of the Tokugawa clan.

The main samurai vassals of the Yūki (Yūki shi-ten) included the Tagaya clan, the Mizutani clan, the Yamakawa clan and the Iwakami clan.

Select list

Yūki Tomomitsu, 1168-1254, 1st head of Yūki Domain
Yūki Tomohiro, son of Tomomitsu
Yūki Hirotsugu, son of Tomohiro
Yūki Sukehiro, son of Tomohiro at Shirakawa in Mutsu, 1298
Yūki Munehiro, d. c. 1340
Yūki Chikatomo, d. 1347
Yūki Chikamitsu, d. 1336
Yūki Akitomo, d. c. 1370, son of Chikatomo
Yūki Ujitomo, 1398-1441
Yūki Noritomo, 1439-1462
Yūki Masatomo, 1477-1545
Yūki Masakatsu, 1504-1559
Yūki Harutomo, 1534-1616, adopted son of Oyama Taketomo
Yūki Hideyasu, adopted son of Tokugawa Ieyasu
Yūki Naomoto

See also
Yūki Kassen Ekotoba, scroll painting depicting Yūki Ujitomo's rebellion against the Ashikaga shogunate

References

 
Japanese clans